Caranx is a genus of tropical to subtropical marine fishes in the jack family Carangidae, commonly known as jacks, trevallies and kingfishes. They are moderate- to large-sized, deep-bodied fishes which are distinguished from other carangid genera by specific gill raker, fin ray and dentition characteristics. The genus is represented in the Pacific, Indian and Atlantic Oceans, inhabiting both inshore and offshore regions, ranging from estuaries and bays to deep reefs and offshore islands. All species are powerful predators, taking a variety of fish, crustaceans and cephalopods, while they in turn are prey to larger pelagic fishes and sharks. A number of fish in the genus have a reputation as powerful gamefish and are highly sought by anglers. They often make up high amounts of the catch in various fisheries, but are generally considered poor to fair table fishes.

Taxonomy and naming
The genus Caranx is one of 30 currently recognised genera of fish in the jack and horse mackerel family Carangidae, this family are part of the order Carangiformes. The species has long been placed in the subfamily Caranginae (or tribe Carangini), with modern molecular and genetic studies indicating this subdivision is acceptable, and Caranx is well defined as a genus. Phylogenetically, the monotypic genus of Gnathanodon is most closely related to Caranx; and indeed its sole member was once classified under Caranx.

Caranx was created by the French naturalist Bernard Germain de Lacépède in 1801 to accommodate a new species he had described, Caranx carangua (the crevalle jack), which was later found to be a junior synonym of Scomber hippos, which in turn was transferred to Caranx. The early days of carangid taxonomy had over 100 'species' designated as members of the genus, most of which were synonyms, and a number of genera were created which were later synonymised with Caranx. Caranx took authority over these other genera names due to its prior description, rendering the rest as invalid junior synonyms. Today, after extensive reviews of the family, 18 species are considered valid by major taxonomic authorities Fishbase and ITIS, although many other species are unable to be properly validated due to poor descriptions. The fish in the genus are commonly referred to as jacks, trevallies or kingfishes. Like the genus Carangoides, the word Caranx is derived from the French carangue, used for some fishes of the Caribbean.

Species
The 18 currently recognized extant species in this genus are:

Evolution
The first representative of Caranx found in the fossil record dates back to the mid-Eocene, a period when many modern Perciform lineages appeared. Fossils mostly consist of otoliths, with the bony skeletal material rarely preserved. They are generally found in shallow marine or brackish water sedimentary deposits.
A number of extinct species have been definitively identified and scientifically named, including:
Caranx annectens Stinton, 1980 Eocene, England
Caranx carangopsis Steindachner, 1859 Cenozoic, Austria
Caranx daniltshenkoi Bannikov, 1990 Cenozoic, Russia
Caranx exilis Rueckert-Uelkuemen, 1995 Cenozoic, Turkey
Caranx extenuatus Stinton, 1980 Eocene, England
Caranx gigas Rueckert-Uelkuemen, 1995 Cenozoic, Turkey
Caranx gracilis Kramberger, 1882 Oligocene-Lower Miocene, Romania
Caranx hagni Rueckert-Uelkuemen, 1995 Cenozoic, Turkey
Caranx macoveii Pauca, 1929 Oligocene-Lower Miocene, Romania 
Caranx petrodavae Simionescu, 1905 Oligocene-Lower Miocene, Romania 
Caranx praelatus Stinton, 1980 Eocene, England
Caranx primaevus Eastman, 1904 Eocene, Italy (may be attributable to own genus Eastmanalepes)
Caranx quietus Bannikov, 1990 Cenozoic, Russia

Description

The species in the genus Caranx are all moderately large to very large fishes, growing from around 50 cm in length to a known maximum length of 1.7 m and 80 kg in weight; a size which is only achieved by the giant trevally, Caranx ignobilis, the largest species of Caranx. In their general body profile, they are similar to a number of other jack genera, having a deep, compressed body with a dorsal profile more convex than the ventral. The dorsal fin is in two parts, the first consisting of 8 spines and the second of one spine and between 16 and 25 soft rays. The anal fin has one or two detached anterior spines, with 1 spine and between 14 and 19 soft rays. The caudal fin is strongly forked. All species have moderate to very strong scutes on the posterior section of their lateral lines. All members of Caranx are all generally silver to grey in colour, with shades of blue or green dorsally, while some species have coloured spots on their flanks. Fin colours range from hyaline to yellow, blue and black.

The specific characteristics that distinguish the genus relate to specific anatomical details, with these being a gill raker count between 20 and 31 on the first gill arch, 2 to 4 canines anteriorly positioned in each jaw, and dorsal and anal rays which are never produced into filaments as seen in genera such as Alectis and Carangoides.

Distribution and habitat
Species from the genus Caranx are distributed throughout the tropical and subtropical waters of the world, inhabiting the Atlantic, Pacific and Indian Oceans. They are known from the coasts of all continents and islands (including remote offshore islands) within this range, and have a fairly even species distribution, with no particular region having unusually high amounts of Caranx species.

Most species are coastal fish, and very few venture into waters further offshore than the continental shelf, and these species are generally moved by ocean currents. They inhabit a range of environments including sand flats, bays, lagoons, reefs, sea mounts and estuaries. Most species are demersal, or bottom dwelling, in nature, while others are pelagic, moving long distances in the upper water column.

Biology and fisheries
The level of biological information known about each species in Caranx is generally related to how important they are commercially. All species are predatory fish, taking smaller fish, crustaceans and cephalopods as prey. Most species form schools as juveniles, but generally become more solitary with age. Reproduction and growth has been studied in a number of species, with these characteristics varying greatly between species.

All species in Caranx are of at least minor importance to fisheries, but a number are much more so due to their abundance in certain regions. Most are considered to be gamefish, with some such as the giant trevally and bluefin trevally highly sought after by anglers. They are generally considered poor to fair quality table fishes, and have had a number of ciguatera poisoning cases attributed to them.

References

External links
Caranx at Fishbase

 
Caranginae
Extant Eocene first appearances
Taxa named by Bernard Germain de Lacépède
Marine fish genera